Ionuț Rada may refer to:

 Ionuț Rada (footballer, born 1982), Romanian footballer, who played for Romania National Team and several clubs
 Ionuț Rada (footballer, born 1990), Romanian footballer, who played for Romania at U'21s level and Pandurii Târgu Jiu, Mioveni, and Muscelul Câmpulung clubs